Mirko Dolcini (born 13 November 1973) is a Sammarinese politician, the head of the political party Domani Motus Liberi and one of the Captains Regent with Alessandro Cardelli. Their joint terms was from 1 October 2020 until 1 April 2021.

Life
After graduating in law at the University of Urbino, he obtained the Master in "Specialization in San Marino Law". Since 2003 he has run his own studio. He was President of O.S.L.A, also holding the roles of Vice President and Chief Editor of the association's newspaper. He joined the Domani Motus Liberi and has served as a member of the Grand and General Council from the last elections since 2019.

Dolcini is the father of a child with his wife Monica and he has a twin brother.

References

1973 births
Living people
People from the City of San Marino
University of Urbino alumni
Captains Regent of San Marino
Members of the Grand and General Council
Sammarinese lawyers